Francisco Hernández may refer to:
Francisco Hernández de Toledo (1514–1587), naturalist and court physician to the King of Spain
Francisco Hernández de Córdoba (founder of Nicaragua) (c. 1475–1526)
Francisco Hernández de Córdoba (Yucatán conquistador) (died 1517), Spanish conquistador
Francisco Hernández Ortiz-Pizarro (1555–1613), founder of Fort Calbuco
Francisco Hernández (footballer, born 1949) (1949–2019), football player from Costa Rica
Francisco Hernández (Mexican footballer) (1924–2011), player who competed at the FIFA World Cup
Francisco Hernández Tomé (died 1872), Spanish mural painter
Francisco Jose Hernandez (born 1936), Cuban exile and president of the Cuban American National Foundation
Francisco Hernández (rugby union) (born 1988), Spanish rugby sevens player